Berea is a census-designated place (CDP) in Greenville County, South Carolina, United States. The population was 14,295 at the 2010 census. It is part of the Greenville–Mauldin–Easley Metropolitan Statistical Area.

Geography
Berea is located at  (34.878845, -82.460751).

Demographics

2020 census

As of the 2020 United States census, there were 15,578 people, 5,624 households, and 3,543 families residing in the CDP.

2010 census
At the 2010 census there were 14,295 people, 5,441 households, and 3,728 families living in the CDP. The population density was 1,855.5 people per square mile (716.4/km). There were 6,093 housing units at an average density of 761.6 per square mile (290.1/km). The racial makeup of the CDP was 60.6% White, 18.1% African American, 0.51% Native American, 1.2% Asian, 0.007% Pacific Islander, 16.9% from other races, and 2.7% from two or more races. Hispanic or Latino of any race were 25.4%. People of Mexican ancestry made the largest portion of the CDP's Hispanic or Latino population, at 14.1%.

Of the 5,441 households 29.4% had children under the age of 18 living with them, 43.9% were married couples living together, 17.8% had a female householder with no husband present, and 31.5% were non-families. 25.5% of households were one person and 10.4% were one person aged 65 or older. The average household size was 2.58 and the average family size was 3.05.

The age distribution was 24.1% under the age of 18, 9.4% from 18 to 24, 27.3% from 25 to 44, 22.6% from 45 to 64, and 15.9% 65 or older. The median age was 36.2 years. For every 100 females, there were 94.9 males. For every 100 females age 18 and over, there were 92.0 males.

The median household income was $29,964 and the median family income  was $37,955. Males had a median income of $32,387 versus $30,692 for females. The per capita income for the CDP was $17,257. About 25.1% of families and 31.7% of the population were below the poverty line, including 49.8% of those under age 18 and 13.6% of those age 65 or over.

Education
Berea has a public library, a branch of the Greenville County Library System.

References

Census-designated places in Greenville County, South Carolina
Census-designated places in South Carolina
Upstate South Carolina